This is a list of hospitals in Nicaragua.
Bautista Hospital
Bertha Calderón (De la Mujer) Hospital
Carlos Marx (Alemán-Nicaragüense) Hospital
Alejandro Davila Bolaños Hospital (Military)
Japanese-Nicaraguan Hospital (Hospital Japonés-Nicaragüense)
Manuel de Jesús Rivera,"La Mascota" Hospital
Antonio Lenin Fonseca (Trauma) Hospital
Manolo Morales (Roberto Calderón) Hospital
Hospital Salud Integral
Metropolitano Vivian Pellas Private Hospital (and Child Burn Unit)
Psychiatric Hospital
Fernando Vélez Paiz, Pediatric Hospital
La Mascota Pediatric Hospital
Hospital Regional Santiago (Jinotepe, Carazo) 
Hospital San José (Diriamba, Carazo)
Hospital Santa Gema, Masaya (offers 24hr emergency)

References

Nicaragua
Hospitals
Hospitals
N